The Roman Catholic Diocese of Serrinha is located in the Brazilian state of Bahia. It is a suffragan diocese of the Archdiocese of Feira de Santana.

History
The diocese was erected on 21 September 2005 with territory taken from the Archdiocese of Feira de Santana and the Diocese of Paulo Afonso

Bishops

Ordinaries
Ottorino Assolari,  (21 September 2005 – 3 February 2021)
Hélio Pereira dos Santos (3 February 2021 - )

Coadjutor Bishop
Hélio Pereira dos Santos (16 October 2020 – 3 February 2021)

References

External links
 

Serrinha
Serrinha
Serrinha
Serrinha